Guzmania patula is a plant species in the genus Guzmania. This species is native to Costa Rica, Panama, Colombia, Venezuela, Ecuador, and the State of Amazonas in Brazil.

References

patula
Flora of Costa Rica
Flora of Panama
Flora of South America
Plants described in 1916